Bakshish Singh (born 20 January 1924) was an Indian wrestler. He competed in the men's freestyle middleweight at the 1956 Summer Olympics.

References

External links
 

1924 births
Possibly living people
People from Jind
Indian male sport wrestlers
Olympic wrestlers of India
Wrestlers at the 1956 Summer Olympics